This is a list of Lima Metro stations, excluding abandoned, projected, planned stations, and those under construction.

List of active stations

References

Lima
Lima-related lists